Audu Mohammed (born 30 April 1985) is a Nigerian former footballer who played as a midfielder. He played in Uruguay for Cerro, Nacional, Tacuarembo, Peñarol, Montevideo Wanderers, Bella Vista and Deportivo Maldonado.

References

1985 births
Living people
Nigerian footballers
Nigerian expatriate footballers
Montevideo Wanderers F.C. players
Club Nacional de Football players
Peñarol players
C.A. Cerro players
C.A. Bella Vista players
Expatriate footballers in Uruguay
Association football midfielders